"I'm Confused" is a song by Swedish singer Pandora. It was released in October 2004 as the fourth and final single from the Swedish version of Pandora's ninth studio album 9 Lives (2003).

Track listing
 "I'm Confused" - 3:36

Chart performance

References

2004 singles
2004 songs
English-language Swedish songs
Virgin Records singles
Pandora (singer) songs